The Reform Party (abbreviation: RP) is an opposition political party in Singapore.

The Reform Party is a liberal-democratic party. According to the party's constitution, it seeks to promote "political, social and economic reform; the restoration of full human rights; a fairer and just distribution of wealth with the elimination of poverty; an independently appointed judiciary and a fully elected and sovereign parliament". Its stated philosophy is "That every member of the society is born with fundamental rights which cannot be abrogated... and that it is the paramount duty of the society to promote the human dignity of its every single member."

It was founded by opposition veteran and lawyer J. B. Jeyaretnam, notable as the former Secretary-General of the Workers' Party of Singapore and the first opposition candidate in post-independence Singapore, on 3 July 2008. Around three months after the party's foundation, founder Jeyaretnam died on 30 September, and the leadership has since taken over by his son, Kenneth Jeyaretnam.

History
The Reform Party was founded by lawyer and veteran politician J.B. Jeyaretnam, notable as the first opposition candidate to be elected Member of Parliament under the Workers' Party of Singapore banner after a period of about 16 years when not a single opposition candidate in Singapore won a seat, as well as the secretary-general of the Workers’ Party from 1971 to 2001.

At the time, Jeyaretnam (then a Non-Constituency Member of Parliament) was sued by then-Senior Minister Lee Kuan Yew and then-Prime Minister Goh Chok Tong over defamation at the total damages amounting S$565,000 including court costs of S$270,000, and was declared bankrupt (which also barred the right from standing in elections) after failing to follow up his payment. He subsequently resigned from his leadership post and party later, citing that the party (notably then-Secretary General Low Thia Khiang) did not receive due support to help him repay his payments. Since his resignation, Jeyaretnam authored the books Make it Right for Singapore and The Hatchet Man of Singapore and was often seen promoting his books outside Centrepoint, a shopping centre on Orchard Road. In May 2007, Jeyaretnam was discharged from bankrupt and eventually reinstated in the bar later September, in which he would go on to register and form Reform Party on 3 July 2008, where he became the pro-tem Secretary-General.

On 30 September, around three months after founding, Jeyaretnam died following a heart attack, and over a thousand people attended his funeral. J.B. Jeyaretnam's son, Kenneth Jeyaretnam, who at the time resided with his British family in the United Kingdom and had previously never participated in politics directly, took over as secretary-general in April 2009.

On 8 May 2010, the party announced its six candidates well in advance of the upcoming General Election, which also include Kenneth. However, several members who also joined the party resigned to join other parties, such as Jeannette Chong-Aruldoss, Tony Tan Lay Thiam and his wife Hazel Poa, Nicole Seah, James Teo, J. Sivalingam; Justin Ong, Samantha De Silva, Gan Theng Wei and Tan Tee Seng. Earlier on, the party was initially invited by the Singapore Democratic Alliance (a collation formed by then-opposition MP Chiam See Tong of the Singapore People's Party, along with Justice Party and Pertubuhan Kebangsaan Melayu Singapura), but the CEC members of the alliance denied their request.

The party fielded two teams to contest in West Coast GRC and Ang Mo Kio GRC, which were respectively led by then-Minister of Trade & Industry Lim Hng Kiang and Prime Minister Lee Hsien Loong, both by People's Action Party (PAP). In his first campaign speech on late April 2011, Kenneth said that competition in politics would lead to better and more intelligent policies for Singapore. He also noted that the ruling People's Action Party (PAP) would likely open the floodgates to more foreigners to enter Singapore again once they formed the next government.

However, their electoral debut was unable to bear fruit, as both contests were lost to the PAP with a combined vote share of under 35% from the two constituencies that it contested. Some members subsequently left the party afterwards.

Their subsequent contests for the 2013 by-election and 2015 general elections neither see improvement in the party, as the party lost contests to the WP and PAP, respectively, by large margins.

In 2018, they were among the seven other opposition parties (the other were People's Power Party, Singaporeans First, Singapore Democratic Party, Democratic Progressive Party, National Solidarity Party, and People's Voice Party, the latter formed by former NSP chief Lim Tean) present in a meeting led by former PAP MP Tan Cheng Bock, in their discussion of a possibility of forming a collation for the next election.

On 5 August 2020, chairman Andy Zhu and treasurer Noraini Yunus were removed by Jeyaretnam from the CEC with, CEC member Charles Yeo and deputy treasurer Mahaboob Batcha, taking their places as chairman and treasurer respectively. Several members left the party and followed Zhu and Noraini to form the Singapore United Party.

Objectives
The slogan on the Reform Party's website states "Transparency, Accountability and Inclusion: A democratic Singapore for Singaporeans." In the 2015 elections, the party slogan was "A Brighter Future Tomorrow, Today".

The main objectives of the party stated in its constitution are: to maintain and promote an independently appointed judiciary and a fully elected and sovereign parliament; to ensure that every member of society is entitled to political, social and economic rights; and to eliminate poverty by enforcing a fairer and just distribution of wealth.

In its National Day Message 2015 published on 9 August 2015, the party stated, "We need to secure for Singaporeans a fairer distribution of the national wealth by redistributing some of the massive wealth hoarded by the PAP Government."  It proposed to do this "without adopting a high tax regime which might damage Singapore's competitiveness", given the healthy state of Singapore's national finances.

On nomination day for the 2015 General Elections (1 September), the party proposed a S$500 monthly allowance to Singaporean citizens aged 65 years and above.

Organisation
The Reform Party is unique among the political parties in Singapore, both government and opposition, in that its party structure does not follow a cadre based system of political organisation. The party constitution states that the Party Conference is the supreme governing authority.

Leadership

List of secretaries-general

Central Executive Committee

Electoral performance

General Election 2011
In their inaugural election, they party garnered only 31.8% of the votes contested in Ang Mo Kio and West Coast GRCs. Their overall popular vote was 4.3%.

By-election 2013
A by-election in Punggol East Single Member Constituency was held on 26 January 2013 after the resignation of former parliamentary speaker Michael Palmer on 12 December 2012. Secretary-general Kenneth participated in the by-election, but was defeated to WP's Lee Li Lian in a rare four-cornered contest. Additionally, due to a vote split towards the major parties, Kenneth had forfeited his S$14,500 election deposit as he garnered only 1.2% of the valid votes cast (per electoral rules, the threshold of retaining the deposit is 12.5%, or one-eighth, of the valid votes cast for the constituency).

2015 general election
Their second general election (and third overall) also fielded 11 candidates contested in three contested constituencies, with the addition of Radin Mas SMC, a ward part of the Jeyaretnam's former Anson constituency, and the two previously contested GRCs, Ang Mo Kio and West Coast. The election also marked the debut of activists Roy Ngerng and M Ravi. In their nomination speech for Ang Mo Kio GRC, Ravi's speech was made semi-viral after he accidentally chanted out PAP before quickly correcting to RP while persuading the voters to vote for their party. On 7 September, they subsequently released their manifesto.

On 11 September, their electoral performance dwindled down compared to the last election as they garnered only 20.60% of the votes on the three constituencies contested, or 2.63% of the overall popular vote, which was mostly attributed to the large swing towards the ruling party, where they attained large winning margins.

2020 general election 
The party fielded only six candidates and contested two constituencies, Ang Mo Kio GRC and Radin Mas; in a breaking tradition, the party chose not to contest West Coast GRC, which was reserved by the new party Progress Singapore Party led by former MP Tan Cheng Bock.

Ahead of the elections, the party had accused the Progress Singapore Party for not living up to an agreement so that they could avoid a three way fight with the PAP in Yio Chu Kang SMC. In response, the PSP argued that no such agreement existed. During the campaigning period, secretary-general Kenneth did not participate in the campaigning nor turn up for televised broadcasts as he was serving a mandatory 14-day Stay Home Notice after a visit to United Kingdom.

On 10 July, the party won neither constituencies, with vote shares of 28.09% and 25.97% respectively. Though the party improved their party's vote share by 27.84% from the last election, their overall popular vote fell to 2.19%.

Election results

Parliament

Parliament by-elections

See also
Joshua Benjamin Jeyaretnam
Kenneth Jeyaretnam
Singapore General Election, 2011
Singapore General Election, 2015

References

External links

 

Political parties established in 2008
2008 establishments in Singapore
Political parties in Singapore
Liberal parties in Singapore